The 2013–14 Hong Kong Second Division League was the 68th season of Hong Kong Second Division League, the second-tier football league in Hong Kong.

The league started in September 2013 and ended in May 2014.

Teams

Changes from preceding season

From Second Division League
Promoted to First Division League
 Yuen Long
 Happy Valley
 Eastern Salon

Relegated to Third Division League
 Sham Shui Po

To Second Division League
Relegated from First Division League
 Wofoo Tai Po

Promoted from Third Division League
 Wong Tai Sin
 Lucky Mile
 Kwun Tong
 Kwai Tsing

Team review
A total of 12 teams contested the league, including 7 sides from the 2012–13, 1 team relegated from the First Division and 4 sides promoted from the Third Division.

Foreign players
The number of foreign players is restricted to three .

League table

Positions by round

Results

Fixtures and results

Round 1

Round 2

Remark: Week 2 matches were cancelled and postponed due to typhoon.

Round 3

Round 4

Round 5

Round 6

Round 7

Round 8

Round 9

Round 10

Round 11

Round 12

Round 13

Round 14

Round 15

Round 16

Round 17

Round 18

Round 19

Round 20

Round 21

Round 22

References

Hong Kong Second Division League seasons
Hong
2013–14 in Hong Kong football leagues